Baldhead Bridge is the second album by the Jamaican roots reggae band Culture, released on Joe Gibbs in 1978.

Production
As with the band's debut, Two Sevens Clash, the album was recorded in Kingston at the studio of Joe Gibbs, who also produced the album.

The band accompanying the trio was The Professionals, which included musicians such as Sly and Robbie, Tommy McCook, and Bobby Ellis.

Critical reception
AllMusic called the album "a true reggae classic," writing that "listeners are reminded of the impact that the Delfonics, the Impressions and other soul favorites had on reggae." Record Collector praised the "outrageously brutal" dub version of the album.

Track listing
 "Them A Payaka"
 "How Can I Leave Jah"
 "Baldhead Bridge"
 "Behold I Come"
 "Love Shines Brighter"
 "Jah Love"
 "Zion Gate"
 "So Long Babylon A Fool I (And I)"

Personnel
Joseph Hill – lead vocals
Albert Walker – vocals
Kenneth Dayes – vocals
Lloyd Parks – bass
Sly Dunbar – drums
Lennox Gordon – guitar
Robbie Shakespeare – guitar
Eric "Bingy Bunny" Lamont – guitar
Franklyn Waul – keyboards
Errol Nelson – keyboards
Harold Butler – keyboards
Uziah "Sticky" Thompson – percussion
Herman Marquis – alto saxophone
Vin Gordon – trombone
Tommy McCook – tenor saxophone
Bobby Ellis – trumpet

References

1978 albums
Culture (band) albums
Shanachie Records albums